The Mantamonadidae are of free-living heterotrophic flagellates that move primarily by gliding on surfaces (rather than swimming).  There is one genus, Mantamonas.  It has been suggested previously that the Mantamonadidae be classified in Apusozoa as sister of the Apusmonadida on the basis of rRNA analyses. However, mantamonads are currently placed in CRuMs on the basis of phylogenomic analyses that identify their closest relatives as the collodictyonids (=diphylleids) and Rigifila.

Taxonomy
 Order Mantamonadida Cavalier-Smith Glücksman et al. 2011
 Family Mantamonadidae Cavalier-Smith Glücksman et al. 2011
 Genus Mantamonas Cavalier-Smith Glücksman et al. 2011
 Species Mantamonas plastica Cavalier-Smith & Glücksman 2011

Phylogeny

References

Podiata orders